Punta del Fortino Lighthouse is an active lighthouse located at the end of the south western point of the Bay of Sapri, Campania on the Tyrrhenian Sea.

Description
The lighthouse is completely automated and operated by the Marina Militare with the identification code number 2676 E.F.

See also
 List of lighthouses in Italy
 Sapri

References

External links

 Servizio Fari Marina Militare

Lighthouses in Italy